Knightsmill is a hamlet in Cornwall, England. It is half a mile east of St Teath. It is in the civil parish of Tintagel

References

Hamlets in Cornwall